The Quint Neck Guitar (also known as a five neck guitar) consists of 5 guitar necks, with accompanying hardware and pick-ups in one oversized body, used by Rick Nielsen from the rock band Cheap Trick.

History
The guitar's birth was first conceived on ruled note book paper by musician Rick Nielsen during one of his frequent scribble sessions. He brought the idea to his manufacturer (Hamer Guitars) to build. The original design sought by Rick was a circular guitar allowing him to spin the guitar from neck to neck.  This design was scrapped by Hamer due to weight and logistical issues.

Rick Nielsen and Bobby Demonic both have employed several five necks over the years.  Nielsen's original "orange Quint neck" with dove tail jointed necks, was retired in the mid-1990s after the top neck snapped off after years of abuse.  It was replaced by a black and white with 1/2 inch checkers (Rick's unofficial trademark).

References
Hamer News 
Guitars Of The Stars: Rick Nielsen (hardcover book)

Experimental musical instruments